The Bad the Worse and the Out of Print is a b-sides and rarities compilation album by New Jersey punk band the Bouncing Souls. It was released on August 29, 2000. It includes tracks previously released on EPs and compilations, which include covers and alternate versions of songs on previous albums, as well as demos and outtakes.

Song information

Track listing
All songs by The Bouncing Souls unless otherwise noted.
 "The Ballad Of Johnny X" (Johnny X, The Bouncing Souls) – 2:12
 "Mommy, Can I Go Out And Kill Tonight?" (Glen Danzig) – 1:55
 "QuickCheck Girl" – 2:59
 "Kids In America" (Reginald Smith) – 3:37
 "P.M.R.C." – 2:47
 "Slave To Fashion" – 2:30
 "Code Blue" (T.S.O.L.) – 2:02 mp3
 "Lamar Vannoy" – 3:22
 "Punk Uprisings Theme" – 1:00 
 "Kicked In The Head" – 3:42
 "St. Jude's Day" (Johnny X, The Bouncing Souls) – 3:08
 "Pervert" (Tony Lombardo, Milo Aukerman) – 1:41
 "Don't You (Forget About Me)" (Keith Forsey, Steve Schiff) – 4:49
 "Spank" – 2:57
 "Like A Fish In Water" – 0:36
 "Born To Lose" (Frankie Brown, Ted Daffan) – 1:57
 "Dirt" – 2:50
 "East Coast! Fuck You!" – 1:04
 "I Started Drinking Again" – 1:44
 "Instrumental" – 1:18
 "Here We Go" – 3:22
 "Neurotic" – 3:04

Personnel
Greg Attonito – vocals
Pete Steinkopf – guitar
Bryan Keinlen – bass, artwork
Shal Khichi – drums

The Bouncing Souls albums
B-side compilation albums
2002 compilation albums
Chunksaah Records compilation albums